HD 141937 is a star in the southern zodiac constellation of Libra, positioned a couple of degrees to the north of Lambda Librae. It is a yellow-hued star with an apparent visual magnitude of 7.25, which means it is too faint to be seen with the naked eye. This object is located at a distance of 108.9 light years from the Sun based on parallax, but is drifting closer with a radial velocity of −2.2 km/s. It has an absolute magnitude of 4.71.

This is a G-type main-sequence star with a stellar classification of G1V. It is a solar-type star with slightly higher mass and radius compared to the Sun. The metallicity is higher than solar. It is an estimated 3.8 billion years old and is spinning with a projected rotational velocity of 6 km/s. The star is radiating 1.2 times the luminosity of the Sun from its photosphere at an effective temperature of 5,890 K.

The star has a substellar companion (HD 141937 b) announced in April 2001 by the European Southern Observatory. It has a minimum mass of 9.7 . In 2020, the inclination of the orbit was measured, revealing its true mass to be 27.4 , which makes it a brown dwarf. A 653-day orbit places the orbital distance 1.5 times farther away from the star as Earth is from the Sun, with a high eccentricity of 41%.

See also 
 HD 142022
 HD 142415
 List of extrasolar planets

References

G-type main-sequence stars
Brown dwarfs
Libra (constellation)
Durchmusterung objects
141937
077740